The USS LST-517 was a tank landing ship in the service of the United States Navy during World War II.

LST-517 was laid down on 10 September 1943 at Seneca, Illinois by the Chicago Bridge & Iron Company; launched on 15 January 1944; sponsored by Miss Onita Watland Walker; and commissioned on 7 February 1944. During World War II, LST-517 was assigned to the European theater and participated in the invasion of Normandy on 6 June 1944. Upon her return to the United States, she was decommissioned on 21 December 1945 and struck from the Navy list on 21 January 1946. A year later the tank landing ship was transferred to the Maritime Administration for disposal and sold for scrap to the National Metal and Steel Corporation on 17 January 1947. 
 
LST-517 received one battle star for World War II service.

See also
 List of United States Navy LSTs

References

 
 

World War II amphibious warfare vessels of the United States
Ships built in Seneca, Illinois
1944 ships
LST-491-class tank landing ships